All Saints' Church, Weston may refer to:

 All Saints' Church, Weston, Cheshire, England
 All Saints' Church, Weston, Nottinghamshire, England 
 All Saints' Church, Weston, Somerset, England
 All Saints' Church, Weston-on-Avon, Warwickshire, England